Pierce Phillips (born 6 October 1992) is an English rugby union player who plays for Edinburgh Rugby in the United Rugby Championship

After played for Leeds Tykes academy and stints with Darlington Mowden Park. Phillips signed for Jersey Reds in the RFU Championship from the summer of 2014. On 28 July 2016, he was named new club captain for Jersey during the 2016-17 season.

On 22 February 2017, Phillips signed for Aviva Premiership side Worcester Warriors ahead of the 2017-18 season. On 26 February 2019, Phillips moves to France with Agen in the Top 14 on a two-year deal next season.

References

1992 births
Living people
English rugby union players
Jersey Reds players
Leeds Tykes players
Rugby union players from Middlesbrough
Worcester Warriors players
SU Agen Lot-et-Garonne players
Edinburgh Rugby players
Rugby union locks